The Columbia Hospital for Women was a hospital located in Washington, D.C. Originally opening in 1866 as a health-care facility for wives and widows of Civil War soldiers, it moved in 1870 from Thomas Circle to its later location at 2425 L Street, NW in the West End neighborhood. The Columbia became a private, non-profit hospital when President Dwight D. Eisenhower signed legislation transferring it to a board of directors in 1953. The facility closed in 2002 and the building was converted into a condominium, The Columbia Residences.

Among the more than 250,000 people born at Columbia Hospital for Women were Duke Ellington, Marion Christopher Barry, Al Gore, Andrew Schwartz, Katherine Heigl, Michael Dominic, Julie Nixon Eisenhower, and Wes Moore.

References

Women's hospitals
Defunct hospitals in Washington, D.C.
Military hospitals in the United States
Residential condominiums in Washington, D.C.
Women's organizations based in the United States
Hospital buildings completed in 1870
Hospitals established in 1866
1866 establishments in Washington, D.C.
2002 disestablishments in Washington, D.C.
Hospitals disestablished in 2002
Women in Washington, D.C.